Holly Evans (born 20 February 1987) is a former field and indoor hockey player from Australia.

Personal life
Holly Evans was born and raised in Adelaide, South Australia.

Introduced to hockey by family at a young age, Evans' father Roy coached hockey for South Australia at a national level, whilst her older brother Dylan has also played representative hockey for the SA Hotshots.

Evans currently resides in her home city of Adelaide, where she works as an Exercise Physiologist.

Career

Domestic hockey

Club level
Evans started playing hockey at age 7 for Burnside HC. She transferred clubs to North East HC (NEHC) whilst still a junior player. At just age 12, she made her debut for the NEHC Division 1 women's team in Hockey SA's Premier League competition. Evans is a life member of NEHC, where she is continues to represent the club as a player-coach in the Premier League division.

National leagues
Evans made her debut into the Australian Hockey League (AHL), Hockey Australia's former premier domestic competition, in 2004. She was a member of her home state's representative team, the SA Suns. During her ten-year AHL career, Evans won one national title with the side, at the 2011 edition of the tournament.

In 2019, following the overhaul of the AHL and subsequent introduction of the Sultana Bran Hockey One League, Evans was named in the preliminary Adelaide Fire squad for season one of the new league. She went on to represent the Adelaide Fire in every match of the league, with the team finishing in third place.

International hockey

Hockeyroos
Known for her speed and swift stick skills, Evans made her international debut for Australia in early 2010 during a test-series against New Zealand in Perth.

Evans secured a place in the 2011 national squad, working towards a potential Olympic appearance in 2012. She made her first appearance at a major tournament during the Oceania Cup in Hobart, where she won a silver medal.

Indoor
In addition to field hockey, Evans also made an impact on the hard court, being selected in the Australian Indoor Squad from 2007 to 2016 and impressively competing at two FIH Indoor World Cups.

Evans competed at the 2011 and 2015 FIH Indoor World Cups, finishing in eighth position on both occasions.

Recognition & Awards
 Hockey SA Premier League Women's Best & Fairest – (2009 and 2016)

References

External links
 
 
 

1987 births
Living people
Australian female field hockey players
Female field hockey midfielders
Sportswomen from South Australia
Field hockey players from Adelaide